Woocoo is a rural locality in the Fraser Coast Region, Queensland, Australia. In the  Woocoo had a population of 48 people.

Geography 
Woocoo consists of three valleys separated by hills. In the south-west the valley is formed by Munna Creek (which is the western boundary of the locality) which is accessible via the Glenbar Road coming from Glenbar to the south. The other two valleys are more centrally located within the locality and are accessed via Ellerslie Road coming from Aramara to the north.

The Woocoo National Park is in the north-west of the locality while a large area of land in the north-east of the locality is part of the St Mary State Forest. Mount Woocoo (240 metres above sea level) is located in the state forest. The land in the valleys is freehold and used as small farms, while the hillier parts of the locality are undeveloped.

History 
The locality name Woocoo presumably takes its name from Mount Woocoo which was in turn is believed to be a corruption of the Kabi word woocoon meaning echidna.

Baemar Provisional School opened in 1901 but closed in 1922 due to low student numbers. It reopened in 1924 but closed again on 1 July 1935 with the students transferred to the new Woocoo State School which opened on 10 July 1935. Woocoo State School closed in 1961.

In the  Woocoo had a population of 48 people.

References

Further reading 

  —includes information on other schools: Braemar, Woocoo, Teebar East, Teebar West, Boompa, Idahlia, Dunmora, Musket Flat, Bowling Green, Aramara North, Aramara, and Gungaloon.

Fraser Coast Region
Localities in Queensland